Ivanishvili is a Georgian surname which may refer to:

Bera Ivanishvili (born 1994), Georgian singer, songwriter, international pop star, hip hop and R&B artist known with his mononym Bera. Son of Bidzina Ivanishvili
Bidzina Ivanishvili, Georgian billionaire and politician
Giorgi Ivanishvili, Georgian football player

Georgian-language surnames
Patronymic surnames
Surnames from given names